The 1990 Nutri-Metics Bendon Classic was a women's tennis tournament played on outdoor hard courts at the ASB Tennis Centre in Auckland in New Zealand that was part of Tier V of the 1990 WTA Tour. It was the fifth edition of the tournament and was held from 29 January until 4 February 1990. Second-seeded Leila Meskhi won the singles title.

Finals

Singles
 Leila Meskhi defeated  Sabine Appelmans 6–1, 6–0
 It was Meskhi's 1st singles title of the year and the 2nd of her career.

Doubles
 Natalia Medvedeva /  Leila Meskhi defeated  Jill Hetherington /  Robin White 3–6, 6–3, 7–6(7–3)

See also
 1990 Benson and Hedges Open – men's tournament

References

External links
 ITF tournament edition details
 Tournament draws

Nutri-Metics International
WTA Auckland Open
Nutri
ASB
ASB
Auck